Kristīne Petrikina (born 13 October 1985) is a Latvian footballer who plays as a defender. She has been a member of the Latvia women's national team.

References

1985 births
Living people
Women's association football defenders
Latvian women's footballers
Latvia women's international footballers
FK Liepājas Metalurgs (women) players
FC Skonto/Cerība-46.vsk. players